Amoeba's Secret is an EP by Paul McCartney recorded during a secret performance at Amoeba Music in Hollywood, California, on 27 June 2007.

The EP reached 119 on the Billboard 200 albums chart, despite relatively little promotion. The low-resolution album art is intentional, as to make the EP resemble a bootleg recording. The back of the sleeve features an incomplete word search whose letters contain hidden details of the recording.

All four songs on this EP were later included on the 2010 12-track promotional CD Live in Los Angeles. Both of these were subsequently replaced by the remixed and expanded 21-track 2019 release of the entire performance called Amoeba Gig.

Release
The EP was originally released in November 2007 in a limited 12" vinyl edition. In January 2009 it received wider release on CD and download formats.

The songs "Only Mama Knows" and "That Was Me" were also released as b-sides to the "Ever Present Past" single in 2007. All the tracks of the EP were later included in the limited edition 2010 live album Live in Los Angeles. The concert in its entirety was released 12 July 2019 on an album titled Amoeba Gig.

Track listing 
"Only Mama Knows" (Paul McCartney) – 3:47
"C Moon" (P. McCartney, Linda McCartney) – 3:17
"That Was Me" (P. McCartney) – 3:03
"I Saw Her Standing There" (Lennon–McCartney) – 3:25

Personnel
Paul McCartney – lead vocals, bass, guitar, mandolin, keyboards
Rusty Anderson – guitar, vocals
Abe Laboriel Jr. – drums, vocals
Brian Ray – guitar, bass, vocals
David Arch – keyboards

Nominations 
Two tracks from this EP were nominated for Grammy Awards in 2008 for the 51st Grammy Awards on 8 February 2009: "That Was Me" for Best Male Pop Vocal Performance and "I Saw Her Standing There" for Best Solo Rock Vocal Performance. Neither song won, and both lost to John Mayer tracks ("Say" and "Gravity" respectively). McCartney performed "I Saw Her Standing There" with Dave Grohl on drums during the ceremony.

Reception 

Writing for AllMusic, Stephen Thomas Erlewine commented: "Sadly, this is just a taste of the full 20-song set, but it's a good one, containing two songs from Memory (the best being "That Was Me," sounding randy and funny in a way it wasn't on LP), a giddy run through "C Moon," and an energetic closer of "I Saw Her Standing There." It's a little of everything from Sir Paul, all of it good, all enough to make you wish you were there, or at least that the whole thing came out on CD."

Charts

Release details

References

External links 
 Paul McCartney Rocked Amoeba at Amoeba Music official website
 Paul McCartney's - Amoeba's Secret at Graham Calkin's Beatles Pages

2007 EPs
Live EPs
Paul McCartney live albums
2007 live albums
Hear Music albums